Max Ettlinger (30 January 1877, in Frankfurt/Main – 12 October 1929, in München) was a German psychologist, philosopher, pedagogist, and aesthetician.

Literary works 

 Ettlinger. 1905. Pierre Bonnier: Le sens du retour. Revue philos. 56 (7), 30–50. 1903. Zeitschrift für Psychologie und Physiologie der Sinnesorgane 38: 56
 Ettlinger. 1905. Gaston Rageot: Les formes simples de l'attention. Revue philos. 56 (8), 113–141. 1903. Zeitschrift für Psychologie und Physiologie der Sinnesorgane 38: 58-60
 Ettlinger. 1905. Henri Piéron: L'association médiate. Revue philos. 56 (8), 142–149. 1903. Zeitschrift für Psychologie und Physiologie der Sinnesorgane 38: 60
 Ettlinger. 1905. Gustave Loisel: La sexualité. Revue scient. 19 (22), 673–680. 1903. Zeitschrift für Psychologie und Physiologie der Sinnesorgane 38: 77
 Ettlinger. 1905. Marcel Mauxion: Les éléments et l'évolution de la moralité. Revue philosophique I u. II, 56 (7), 1-29; (8), 150–180. 1903. Zeitschrift für Psychologie und Physiologie der Sinnesorgane 38: 78-79
 Zimmer. 1905. Max Ettlinger: Untersuchungen über die Bedeutung der Deszendenztheorie für die Psychologie. Köln, Bachem. 1903. 86 S. Zeitschrift für Psychologie und Physiologie der Sinnesorgane 38: 321-322
 Philosophische Fragen der Gegenwart, 1925
 Beiträge zur Lehre von der Tierseele ind ihrer Entwicklung, 1925
 Wesen und Wert der Erziehungswissenschaft, 1929

External links 
 https://web.archive.org/web/20070928084847/http://itfilosofia.net/filosofia/Ettlinger-%20Max-13FA.html (Italian)
 https://web.archive.org/web/20070930155816/http://www.kereso.hu/yrk/Erinv/192510

German psychologists
1877 births
1929 deaths